Queen Hotel, Chester, is on the corner of City Road and Station Road, Chester, Cheshire, England, and stands opposite Chester General Station.  The hotel is recorded in the National Heritage List for England as a designated Grade II listed building.

History

The hotel was built in 1860, and was designed by T. M. Penson. It was intended to serve first-class railway travellers.  Other travellers used the Albion Hotel (later the Town Crier) on the opposite corner.  The two hotels were linked by an underground passage.  Queen Hotel was damaged by fire in 1861, and was rebuilt to the same plan, but without its high roofs and viewing platforms, in 1862 by Penson and Cornelius Sherlock.  An additional porch was added later to the City Road side.

Architecture

Queen Hotel is constructed in brick and stucco in an Italianate style, and has a slate roof.  The main block has four storeys and a basement, with eleven windows on the Station Road side, facing the station, one on the rounded corner, and eight on the City Road side.  To the south, on City Road, is a lower wing with ten windows.  A single-storey stable wing, now used for additional rooms, joins the east side of the hotel to the station.  It has an archway for coaches, with four bays to the right and two bays to the left.  On the Station Road side of the main block is a porch with Corinthian columns and seven steps leading up to the entrance.  Standing on the pediment of the porch is a statue of Queen Victoria by Thomas Thornycroft.  On the City Road side is another porch, constructed in Portland stone, and in Art Deco style.

See also

Grade II listed buildings in Chester (north and west)

References

External links

Hotel website

Hotel buildings completed in 1862
Queen Hotel
Grade II listed hotels
Hotels in Cheshire
Grade II listed buildings in Chester
Italianate architecture in England
Hotels established in 1862
1862 establishments in England
Thomas Mainwaring Penson buildings